Ali Şahin (born 20 May 1944) is a Turkish former wrestler who competed in the 1972 Summer Olympics.

References

External links
 

1944 births
Living people
Olympic wrestlers of Turkey
Wrestlers at the 1972 Summer Olympics
Turkish male sport wrestlers
Place of birth missing (living people)
Members of the 24th Parliament of Turkey
20th-century Turkish people